"My Baby's Gone" is a song written by Dennis Linde, and originally recorded by American country music duo The Judds for their 1984 studio album Why Not Me.

American country music band Sawyer Brown released their version in October 1988, as the first single from the studio album Wide Open.  The song reached number 11 on the Billboard Hot Country Singles chart.

Note: This song is not to be confused with the Hazel Houser penned song originally recorded American country music duo The Louvin Brothers in 1958.  The Louvin Brothers song has been covered by many country artists, including a version by American country duo The Kendalls, that reached number 14 on the Billboard Hot Country Songs singles chart in 1984.

Chart performance

References

1984 songs
1988 singles
The Judds songs
Sawyer Brown songs
Songs written by Dennis Linde
Song recordings produced by Ron Chancey
Capitol Records Nashville singles
Curb Records singles